The 2014 College Football All-America Team includes those players of American college football who have been honored by various selector organizations as the best players at their respective positions.  The selector organizations award the "All-America" honor annually following the conclusion of the fall college football season.  The original All-America team was the 1889 College Football All-America Team selected by Caspar Whitney and Walter Camp.  In 1950, the National Collegiate Athletic Bureau, which is the National Collegiate Athletic Association's (NCAA) service bureau, compiled the first list of All-Americans including first-team selections on teams created for a national audience that received national circulation with the intent of recognizing selections made from viewpoints that were nationwide.  Since 1957, College Sports Information Directors of America (CoSIDA) has bestowed Academic All-American recognition on male and female athletes in Divisions I, II, and III of the NCAA as well as National Association of Intercollegiate Athletics athletes, covering all NCAA championship sports.

The 2014 College Football All-America Team is composed of the following College Football All-American first teams chosen by the following selector organizations: Associated Press (AP), Football Writers Association of America (FWAA), American Football Coaches Association (AFCA), Walter Camp Foundation (WCFF), The Sporting News (TSN), Sports Illustrated (SI), USA Today (USAT) ESPN, CBS Sports (CBS), College Football News (CFN), Scout.com, and Yahoo! Sports (Yahoo!).

Currently, the NCAA compiles consensus all-America teams in the sports of Division I-FBS football and Division I men's basketball using a point system computed from All-America teams named by coaches associations or media sources.  The system consists of three points for a first-team honor, two points for second-team honor, and one point for third-team honor.  Honorable mention and fourth team or lower recognitions are not accorded any points.  Football consensus teams are compiled by position and the player accumulating the most points at each position is named first team consensus all-American.  Currently, the NCAA recognizes All-Americans selected by the AP, AFCA, FWAA, TSN, and the WCFF to determine Consensus and Unanimous All-Americans.

In 2014, there were 12 unanimous All-Americans.

Offense

Quarterback
Marcus Mariota, Oregon -- UNANIMOUS -- (AP, WCFF, TSN, AFCA, FWAA, USAT, CBS, ESPN, Scout, SI, FOX)

Running back
Tevin Coleman, Indiana -- UNANIMOUS -- (AP, WCFF, TSN, AFCA, FWAA, USAT, CBS, ESPN, Scout, SI, FOX)
James Conner, Pittsburgh  (AFCA)
Melvin Gordon, Wisconsin -- UNANIMOUS -- (AP, WCFF, TSN, AFCA, FWAA, USAT, CBS, ESPN, Scout, SI, FOX)

Wide receiver
Amari Cooper, Alabama -- UNANIMOUS -- (AP, WCFF, TSN, AFCA, FWAA, USAT, CBS, ESPN, Scout, SI, FOX)
Rashard Higgins, Colorado State -- CONSENSUS -- (AP, WCFF, FWAA, USAT, ESPN, SI, FOX)
Jaelen Strong, Arizona State  (ESPN)
Kevin White, West Virginia  (TSN, AFCA, CBS, Scout)

Tight end
Nick O'Leary, Florida State -- CONSENSUS -- (AP, WCFF, AFCA, USAT, CBS, Scout, SI)
Clive Walford, Miami  (FOX)
Maxx Williams, Minnesota  (TSN, FWAA)

Offensive line
Jack Allen, Michigan State  (USAT)
A. J. Cann, South Carolina  (TSN, CBS, ESPN, FOX)
Kyle Costigan, Wisconsin  (ESPN)
Reese Dismukes, Auburn -- CONSENSUS -- (AP, WCFF, AFCA, FWAA, CBS, ESPN, Scout)
Spencer Drango, Baylor -- CONSENSUS -- (AP, FWAA, USAT, ESPN, Scout, FOX)
Cameron Erving, Florida State  (CBS)
Jake Fisher, Oregon  (FWAA)
Hroniss Grasu, Oregon  (TSN, SI)
Rob Havenstein, Wisconsin  (AFCA)
Tre' Jackson, Florida State -- UNANIMOUS -- (AP, WCFF, TSN, AFCA, FWAA, CBS, Scout, SI)
Arie Kouandjio, Alabama  (AFCA, USAT, SI)
Shaquille Mason, Georgia Tech  (USAT)
Cedric Ogbuehi, Texas A&M  (WCFF, Scout)
Andrus Peat, Stanford  (TSN, ESPN, SI)
Brandon Scherff, Iowa -- UNANIMOUS -- (AP, WCFF, TSN, AFCA, FWAA, USAT, CBS, Scout, SI, FOX)
Laken Tomlinson, Duke -- CONSENSUS -- (AP, WCFF)

Defense

Defensive line
Vic Beasley, Clemson -- CONSENSUS -- (AP, WCFF, AFCA, FOX)
Michael Bennett, Ohio State  (CBS)
Joey Bosa, Ohio State -- UNANIMOUS -- (AP, WCFF, TSN, AFCA, FWAA, USAT, CBS, Scout, FOX)
Malcom Brown, Texas -- CONSENSUS -- (AP, TSN, FWAA, USAT, CBS, ESPN, FOX)
Eddie Goldman, Florida State  (SI)
Nate Orchard, Utah  (WCFF, FWAA, ESPN, Scout, SI)
Shane Ray, Missouri -- CONSENSUS -- (WCFF, TSN, AFCA, FWAA, USAT, CBS, Scout, SI)
Danny Shelton, Washington  (AP, TSN, USAT)
Leonard Williams, Southern California  (AFCA, ESPN, FOX)

Linebacker
Paul Dawson, TCU -- CONSENSUS -- (AP, WCFF, USAT, Scout, FOX)
Trey DePriest, Alabama  (AFCA)
Eric Kendricks, UCLA  (TSN, USAT, Scout, SI)
Hau'oli Kikaha, Washington -- UNANIMOUS -- (AP, WCFF, TSN, AFCA, FWAA, CBS, ESPN, Scout, FOX)
Benardrick McKinney, Mississippi State  (FWAA, ESPN, SI)
Shaq Thompson, Washington  (CBS, ESPN, SI)
Scooby Wright III, Arizona -- UNANIMOUS -- (AP, WCFF, TSN, AFCA, FWAA, USAT, CBS, ESPN, Scout, SI, FOX)

Defensive back
Landon Collins, Alabama -- UNANIMOUS -- (AP, WCFF, TSN, AFCA, FWAA, CBS, ESPN, Scout, SI, FOX)
Kurtis Drummond, Michigan State  (FWAA)
Ifo Ekpre-Olomu, Oregon -- CONSENSUS -- (AP, WCFF, AFCA, USAT, SI, FOX)
Senquez Golson, Ole Miss -- UNANIMOUS -- (AP, WCFF, TSN, AFCA, FWAA, USAT, CBS, ESPN, Scout, SI, FOX)
Vernon Hargreaves III, Florida  (TSN, CBS, ESPN)
Gerod Holliman, Louisville -- UNANIMOUS -- (AP, WCFF, TSN, AFCA, FWAA, USAT, CBS, ESPN, Scout, SI, FOX)
Jalen Ramsey, Florida State  (USAT, Scout)

Special teams

Kicker
Roberto Aguayo, Florida State -- CONSENSUS -- (AP, WCFF, TSN, AFCA, USAT, CBS, ESPN, Scout, SI, FOX)
Brad Craddock, Maryland  (FWAA)

Punter
Tom Hackett, Utah -- CONSENSUS -- (AP, WCFF, AFCA, FWAA, CBS, Scout, FOX)
J. K. Scott, Alabama  (TSN, USAT, ESPN, SI)

All-purpose / return specialist
Mario Alford, West Virginia  (FWAA)
Kaelin Clay, Utah  (TSN, CBS, FOX)
Tyler Lockett, Kansas State -- CONSENSUS -- (AFCA, FWAA, CBS, ESPN, Scout, SI, FOX)
Marcus Murphy, Missouri (Scout)
J. J. Nelson, UAB (WCFF, USAT, CBS, SI)
Shaq Thompson, Washington (AP, Scout)

See also
 2014 All-Big 12 Conference football team
 2014 All-Big Ten Conference football team
 2014 All-Pac-12 Conference football team
 2014 All-SEC football team

Notes

References
Walter Camp All-America team
USA Today All-America team
CBS All-America team
ESPN All-America team
Associated Press All-America team
Scout All-America team
Sports Illustrated All-America team
The Sporting News All-America team
American Football Coaches Association All-America team
Football Writers Association of America All-America team
Fox Sports All-American team

All-America Team
College Football All-America Teams